Maackia taiwanensis is a species of legume in the family Fabaceae.

References

Sophoreae
Endemic flora of Taiwan
Endangered flora of Asia
Taxonomy articles created by Polbot